Martinus "Mak" Schoorl (9 February 1913 – 26 November 2011) was a Dutch rower. He competed in two events at the 1936 Summer Olympics.

References

1913 births
2011 deaths
Dutch male rowers
Olympic rowers of the Netherlands
Rowers at the 1936 Summer Olympics
Sportspeople from Haarlem
European Rowing Championships medalists
20th-century Dutch people
21st-century Dutch people